Gilberto Enrique Méndez Fernández (born November 15, 1974) is a Panamanian professional baseball pitcher.

He first played in the 2001 Baseball World Cup. In the 2002 Intercontinental Cup, he allowed five runs in 2 innings of work. He struck out six and allowed one run in four innings of work in the 2003 Baseball World Cup. In the 2005 Baseball World Cup, he allowed one run in three innings of work, and in the 2007 Pan American Games, he allowed one run in two innings of work. During the 2007 Baseball World Cup, he allowed three walks and three runs in 2 innings of work, and in the 2008 Americas Baseball Cup he went 0-1 with a 4.91 ERA.

Hr appeared on Panama's roster in the 2009 World Baseball Classic, but did not play.

In 2019, he was selected for Panama at the 2019 Pan American Games Qualifier.

References

1974 births
Living people
Baseball pitchers
Baseball players at the 2007 Pan American Games
Baseball players at the 2011 Pan American Games
Pan American Games competitors for Panama
Sportspeople from Panama City
2009 World Baseball Classic players
Auburn Doubledays players
Dominican Summer League Nationals players
Gulf Coast Nationals players
Hagerstown Suns players
Harrisburg Senators players
Leones del Escogido players
Potomac Nationals players
Panamanian expatriate baseball players in the Dominican Republic
Panamanian expatriate baseball players in the United States